Samuel Walker McGivern (born 9 October 1963) was a Scottish footballer who played for Kilmarnock, Falkirk, Ayr United and Dumbarton. While at Kilmarnock McGivern won the 1982 European Under-18 Championship with Scotland.

References

1963 births
Scottish footballers
Dumbarton F.C. players
Kilmarnock F.C. players
Falkirk F.C. players
Ayr United F.C. players
Scottish Football League players
People from Kilwinning
Living people
Association football midfielders